Wandsworth Park is a  Grade II listed  public urban park on the banks of the River Thames in the London Borough of Wandsworth, situated between Putney and Wandsworth town centres.

Geography 
It has a central  playing field in an oval of paths.

History 
Until 1897 the land was allotments, it was purchased for £33,000 in 1898 by London County Council, Wandsworth District Board, and by public subscription.  The park plans were made by Lt. Col. J. J. Sexby, a horticulturist and London County Council’s then Superintendent of Parks, and in 1903 the park opened on Saturday 28 February.

The Friends of Wandsworth Park are a community organisation set up in 2018  to improve and sustain the park and manage the formal garden areas.

Features 
Two pieces from the Putney Sculpture Trail by sculpturer Alan Thornhill are in the park, Nexus is on the southern side by Putney Bridge road and Pygmalion is on the north eastern riverside near the entrance to Prospect Quay.  There are two Victorian stink pipes to provide ventilation for Joseph Bazalgette's sewer system.  A new riverside terrace opened in 2019 on the north west corner of the park, a formally disused area.

Wildlife 

There are over 350 trees within the park, on the north side is the Lime Avenue.  On the river alongside the park are some bird barges, to mitigate habitat lost during building development around Point Pleasant and the Wandsworth Riverside Quarter.  The barges have tall posts to attract herons and cormorants, corrugated roofs for lesser black headed gulls and bird boxes for kingfishers and sand martins.

Amenities 
The park has public toilets near to the cafe.

The children's playground established was built in 1960 and is a certified Neighbourhood Area Equipped for Play, suitable for 2 to 7 year olds and 8 to 14/16 year olds.

The Luna Cinema has shown films open air in the park.

Sports grounds 
The central lawn area includes an 11 a side football pitch and a junior football pitch.  The tennis courts and pavilion were added in 1920s, the courts can be booked via All Star Tennis.

The park has flat surfaces for running, the loop by the river is 0.6 mile (1,500-step) in length, and the Wandsworth park 10K is over 5 laps of the whole park.

The park has a 12 hole golf course and cafe run by Putt in the Park which opened in August 2013

Transport 
The park is served by Transport for London buses 220 and 270 which stop on Putney Bridge Road, Putney Bridge tube station (District line) and Putney railway station (Southwestern Railway) are both half a mile walk from the park, there are Santander Cycles docking stations on the south side and the south western side of the park.

References

External links 
Wandsworth Borough Council pages
Friends of Wandsworth Park website

Urban public parks in the United Kingdom
Parks and open spaces in the London Borough of Wandsworth
1898 establishments in England
Putney